The Vraca Memorial Park (Bosnian,) is a park dedicated to the World War II victims in Sarajevo. It covers 78,000 square meters and mentions the names of over 11,000 men, women, and children killed during World War II.

History
The idea was to rehabilitate an old Austro-Hungarian fortress by combining the work of Vladimir Dobrović as designer, Alija Kučukalić as sculptor, and Aleksandar Maltarić as landscaper. Construction began in April 1980 and was finished in November 1981. The Memorial Park was opened on November 25, 1981, the "Day of Statehood of Bosnia and Herzegovina" in SR Bosnia & Herzegovina commemorationg the date that ZAVNOBIH held their first meeting in 1943.

In 1996, the park was systematically destroyed by withdrawing VRS forces after the signing of the Dayton Agreement.

In 2005, the park was declared a National Monument of Bosnia and Herzegovina.

On 16 May 2019, the park was renovated, where night lighting was connected for the first time,
and the eternal flame was kindled after 27 years.

See also
Partisan cemetery in Livno is located in Livno, Bosnia and Herzegovina.
Partisan Memorial Cemetery in Mostar is located in Mostar, Bosnia and Herzegovina.

References

External link

Parks in Sarajevo
Yugoslav World War II monuments and memorials
Monuments and memorials in Bosnia and Herzegovina
National Monuments of Bosnia and Herzegovina
1981 establishments in Yugoslavia
Memorial parks